Falcon is an unincorporated community in Magoffin County, Kentucky, United States.  It lies along Route 40 northeast of the city of Salyersville, the county seat of Magoffin County.  Its elevation is 974 feet (297 m).  It has a post office with the ZIP code 41426.

References

Unincorporated communities in Magoffin County, Kentucky
Unincorporated communities in Kentucky